Roald Tweet (1933–2020) was a professor of English at Augustana College and a historian of the upper Mississippi River.

Biography 
Tweet was the husband of Margaret Tweet, the brother of David Tweet, father of Randall Tweet, Gretchen O'Brien, and Jonathan Tweet. Roald also was a grandfather and a great grandfather. Tweet was part of the Agustin's Historical Society, St. John's Lutheran Church, Contemporary Club, Eagle Scouts, and a member of Sons of Norway. He earned a master's degree in English and a Ph.D. in American Literature from the University of Chicago. He created three-minute vignettes about local history for his radio series, "Rock Island Lines," which earned the Illinois Humanities Council's Lawrence W. Towner Award in 2001. He earned the Studs Terkel Humanities Service Award in 2006. His published books include History of Transportation on the Upper Mississippi and Illinois Rivers, A History of the Rock Island District Corps of Engineers, 1866–1983, and The Quad Cities: An American Mosaic. In 2014 he began co-hosting the writing-related radio show Scribble. He was known as a whittler, and his little wooden birds were popular on Augustana campus.

References

External links 
 How Tweet it is Retirement won't hamper the adventures of one of Augustana's more gifted teachers. Quad-City Times. February 16, 1999.
 Geyer, Thomas. Roald Tweet, Quad-City cultural icon, dies at 87. Dispatch-Argus, November 4, 2020. Retrieved November 6, 2020.
 Wooten, Don. Remembering Roald Tweet. Quad-City Times. November 8, 2020. Retrieved November 10, 2020.

21st-century American historians
21st-century American male writers
Augustana College (Illinois) faculty
American male non-fiction writers